Norwegian churches in the United States include:

(by state then city)
Norwegian Seamen's Church, San Pedro (Los Angeles, California)
Faith Bible Church, (Northridge, California)
Norwegian Seamen's Church, San Francisco, (San Francisco, California)
Norwegian Seamen's Church, Miami, (Davie, Florida)
Norwegian Lutheran Memorial Church, (Chicago, Illinois)
Old East Paint Creek Lutheran Church, (Waterville, Iowa)
Sheldahl First Norwegian Evangelical Lutheran Church, (Sheldahl, Iowa)
Norwegian Seamen's Church, New Orleans, (New Orleans, Louisiana)
Christiania Lutheran Free Church, (Eureka Township, Minnesota)
Nora Free Christian Church, (Hanska, Minnesota)
Norwegian Lutheran Memorial Church, (Minneapolis, Minnesota)
Bethany Lutheran Church (Oilmont, Montana)
Clearwater Evangelical Lutheran Church, (Oklee, Minnesota)
Trondhjem Norwegian Lutheran Church, ( Rice County, Minnesota)
Norway Lutheran Church, ( Saint Paul, Minnesota)
Zion Lutheran Church (Shelly, Minnesota)
Norwegian Methodist Episcopal Church (Brooklyn, New York)
Norwegian Seamen's Church, New York, (Manhattan, New York)
Norway Lutheran Church and Cemetery, (Denbigh, North Dakota)
Odalen Lutherske Kirke, (Edinburg, North Dakota)
Viking Lutheran Church, (Maddock, North Dakota)
Vang Evangelical Lutheran Church  (Manfred, North Dakota)
South Wild Rice Church, (Red River Valley, North Dakota)
Our Savior's Scandinavian Lutheran Church,  (Ward County, North Dakota)
Calvary Lutheran Church and Parsonage (Silverton, Oregon)
Aurland United Norwegian Lutheran Church, (Frederick, South Dakota)
Zoar Norwegian Lutheran Church,  ( Grenville, South Dakota)
Golden Valley Norwegian Lutheran Church, (Ralph, South Dakota)
Renner Lutheran Church, (Renner, South Dakota)
Lebanon Lutheran Church, (Summit, South Dakota)
Our Savior's Lutheran Church (Cranfills Gap, Texas)
St. Olaf Kirke,  (Cranfills Gap, Texas) 
Norwegian Seamen's Church, Houston, (Pasadena, Texas)
Free Evangelical Lutheran Church-Bethania Scandinavian Evangelical Lutheran Congregation, (Ephraim, Wisconsin)
Westby Coon-Prairie Lutheran Church, (Westby, Wisconsin)

Churches in the United States